Nenjuku Needhi is a 2022 Indian Tamil-language political drama film directed by Arunraja Kamaraj and produced by Boney Kapoor. A remake of the 2019 Hindi film Article 15, it stars Udhayanidhi Stalin, Aari Arujunan, Tanya Ravichandran, and Shivani Rajashekar. The film revolves around an upright police officer launching an attack against the caste system in India after caste-based discrimination and other crimes are dismissed

Principal photography began in April 2021 and wrapped that December. Nenjuku Needhi was released theatrically on 20 May 2022, and received positive reviews, with praise for Udhayanidhi's performance and story. The film completed 50 days of its theatrical run.

Plot 
Vijaya Raghavan (Udhayanidhi Stalin), an IPS officer, gets posted in a rural part of Tamil Nadu, where caste discrimination and untouchability is still in practice. Though Vijaya Raghavan has read about the discrimination in many books, it gets difficult for him to confront these problems in real life. While he is still grappling with the ideologies of the people around him and trying to educate them, a mysterious case of three missing dalit girls, who were employed in the local factory, makes his life more miserable. Two are found dead, but the case gets complicated, as there is no trace of the third one. Who is behind this heinous crime and how Vijaya Raghavan takes this case forward despite pressure from his casteist higher officials forms the rest of the plot.

Cast 
 Udhayanidhi Stalin as S. Vijaya Raghavan IPS
 Aari Arujunan as Kumaran
 Tanya Ravichandran as Adhithi Vijayaraghvan
 Shivani Rajashekar as Kurinji
 Suresh Chakravarthy as Circle Inspector Sundaram Iyer
 Yamini Chander as Dr. Anitha
 Ilavarasu as Sub-Inspector Malaichami(SC)
 Mayilsamy as V. Villalan
 Abdool lee as Vasan SV
 Ratsasan Saravanan as Nataraj
 Ramesh Thilak as Venkat
 Sayaji Shinde as CBI Officer
 Ravi Venkatraman as Kesavan
 Jeeva Ravi as Superintendent of police 
 Ashvin Raja as Mechanic Suresh

Production 
In September 2019, it was announced that Boney Kapoor had purchased the Tamil remake rights of the 2019 Hindi film Article 15. In August 2020, Kapoor confirmed that the remake was in development. It is Arunraja Kamaraj's second film as director after Kanaa (2019). Udhayanidhi Stalin was chosen to play the lead role originally done by Ayushman Khurrana. Principal photography began in April 2021 in Pollachi. The title Nenjuku Needhi, named after the autobiography of Udhayanidhi's grandfather M. Karunanidhi, was announced on 16 October 2021. Principal photography wrapped in mid-December.

Music 

The film's music is composed by Dhibu Ninan Thomas.

Release

Theatrical 
Nenjuku Needhi was released worldwide on 20 May 2022. The film's distribution rights in Tamil Nadu are held by Red Giant Movies. It was originally scheduled to release in early March 2022, but then delayed to avoid clash with other films like Etharkkum Thunindhavan and Radhe Shyam.

Home media 
The post-theatrical streaming rights of Nenjuku Needhi were bought by SonyLIV. The film began streaming there from 23 June 2022. The satellite rights were sold to Kalaignar TV, where it premiered on 15 August.

Reception 
The Times of India gave a rating of 3.5 out of 5 and wrote, "A deeply-affecting and powerful film on caste disparities and inequality". Puthiya Thalaimurai felt the film would win because it spoke a lot of hard-hitting facts throughout. ABP Nadu wrote the filmmakers criticised the caste that politicians see and those who make a living by doing politics on the basis of caste; Udhayanidhi could be praised for that. Ananda Vikatan wrote that the film speaks of the pain of the oppressed, the guiltless power of the dominant forces, and the role that all of society has in the tyranny of untouchability. The New Indian Express gave 3.5 out of 5 stars and wrote "A heartfelt exploration of an important problem". The Hindu wrote "The remake is well-adapted to suit the social milieu of Tamil Nadu, but doesn't quite immerse you into its world like its original". The News Minute wrote, "Much like the Bollywood original, Nenjuku Needhi turns oppression into spectacle and denies dignity to the very people it claims to represent". A critic from Firstpost gave 3 out of 5 rating and stated that " Udhayanidhi’s presence makes these additions more significant -- the actor’s political lineage and career are no secret. But there’s also no denying that they are well-done. Udhayanidhi’s involvement means we have a few shots of him against the rising sun. But thankfully, the film doesn’t indulge in them too much. Udhayanidhi gives an earnest performance and is well-aided by the ensemble of excellent supporting actors."  Aditya Shrikrishna critic form Mint (newspaper) noted that 'As much as Nenjukku Needhi is well-intentioned, it could have done with embellishments providing cultural and temporal context"

However,Maalai Malar critic noted that "A woman who cooks food is ignored and humiliated because she is a scheduled caste, Pollachi rape incidents, Periyar and Ambedkar statues locked in cages, real incidents are shown here and there. He has done a wonderful job between the characters."Dinamalar Critic gave 3 rating out of 5 and stated that "This is not a typical masala film.It is a film that talks about the issues of Dalit people and the politics surrounding them...".Zee News critic noted that 'This is the 12th film for Udayanidhi. In his 10 years of entering the film industry, he has given a perfect performance in a film that talks about social justice. He makes his mark by giving the signs of a good actor in everything like body language, dialogues and vision. He has progressed in this than his performances in Manithan, Nimir, Kanne Kalaimaane and Psycho."

References

External links 
 

2020s political drama films
2020s Tamil-language films
2022 films
Films about the caste system in India
Indian political drama films
Tamil remakes of Hindi films